This is a list of countries and dependent territories in the Americas by population, which is sorted by the 2015 mid-year normalized demographic projections.

Table

Notes

References

Population
 Population
Demographics of North America
Demographics of South America
Americas, The by population
Americas, The by population
Americas, The by population
Lists of countries by continent, by population
Americas